Plato's Phaedrus: A Defense of a Philosophic Art of Writing is a book by Ronna Burger, in which Burger provides a philosophical analysis of the Phaedrus by Plato.
It has been translated into Chinese (Huaxia Press, 2016).

References 

1980 non-fiction books
University of Alabama Press books
Works about Platonism
Works about Socrates
Theses